Mahmudabad (also Romanized as Maḩmūdābād; also known as Qāzān Tappeh) is a village in Baranduzchay-ye Jonubi Rural District, in the Central District of Urmia County, West Azerbaijan Province, Iran. At the 2006 census, its population was 649, in 136 families.

References 

Populated places in Urmia County